Beo ar Éigean ("almost live") is an Irish-language podcast and radio show produced by Ireland's national broadcaster Raidió Teilifís Éireann (RTÉ). It is presented by Gaeilgeoirs Sinéad Ní Uallacháin, Áine Ní Bhreisleáin and Siún Ní Dhuinn. The three discuss issues from their daily lives. The podcast is specifically produced in the Irish language, but is not about the language itself.

Presenters

Siún Ní Dhuinn
Ní Dhuinn is a writer and producer from Dundalk. She is RTÉ's Irish-language digital producer.

Áine Ní Bhreisleáin
Ní Bhreisleáin is a TV and radio presenter from Gweedore, County Donegal. She presents Bladhaire on Raidio na Gaeltachta ("RnaG") on Thursdays and Fridays.

Sinéad Ní Uallacháin

Ní Uallacháin is a journalist, actress, artist and radio presenter from Ballineanig, County Kerry. She had a weekday show "Sinéad ar Maidin" (Sinéad in the Morning") on RnaG until May 2019.

See also 

 List of Irish podcasts

References

External links
 
 

2017 podcast debuts
Irish podcasts
Audio podcasts
Irish-language mass media
Talk show podcasts